Larnod is a commune in the Doubs department in the Bourgogne-Franche-Comté region in eastern France.

Geography
Larnod is situated on a hill over the valley of the river Doubs.

Population

The inhabitants of the commune are called Larnodiens.

See also
 Communes of the Doubs department

References

External links

 Larnod on the intercommunal Web site of the department 

Communes of Doubs